William Radenhurst Richmond Lyon (1820–1854) was the first reeve of Richmond, Upper Canada (now Ontario).

He was born in Richmond, the son of George Lyon and the first male child born in the village. He was elected reeve in 1850.

He died in 1854 while still in office.

1820 births
1854 deaths
Reeves of Richmond
Canadian people of Scottish descent
Pre-Confederation Ontario people